Point Reyes National Seashore is a  park preserve located on the Point Reyes Peninsula in Marin County, California. As a national seashore, it is maintained by the US National Park Service as an important nature preserve. Some existing agricultural uses are allowed to continue within the park. Clem Miller, a US Congressman from Marin County, wrote and introduced the bill for the establishment of Point Reyes National Seashore in 1962 to protect the peninsula from development which was proposed at the time for the slopes above Drake's Bay.

Geography 

The Point Reyes peninsula is a well defined area, geologically separated from the rest of Marin County and almost all of the continental United States by a rift zone of the San Andreas Fault, about half of which is sunk below sea level and forms Tomales Bay. The peninsula is part of the Salinian Block while across the fault is the Franciscan Complex; the difference in soil composition affects the mix of flora on either side of the fault.

The small town of Point Reyes Station, while not located on the peninsula,  provides most services to it. Some services are also available at Inverness on the west shore of Tomales Bay.

The peninsula includes wild coastal beaches and headlands, estuaries, and uplands. Parts of the park are private farms and ranches which have commercial cattle grazing. These were leased back when the park was purchased to continue these historic uses. Other parts are under the jurisdiction of other conservation authorities with the National Park Service providing signage and managing visitor impact on the entire peninsula and Tomales Bay. The Seashore also administers the parts of the Golden Gate National Recreation area, such as the Olema Valley, that are adjacent to the Seashore.

Wildlife and ecology 
Point Reyes National Seashore lies at the convergence of two marine ecological provinces (southern Oregonian and northern Californian) and harbors 45% of North America's bird species and 18% of California's plant species. The National Seashore's  of coastline include estuaries, bays and lagoons which provide rich habitats including subtidal seagrasses, tidal mudflats and marshes that support a rich diversity of wildlife.

Fauna

The northernmost part of the peninsula is maintained as a reserve for tule elk (Cervus canadensis nannodes), an elk subspecies historically native to the region. Elk are readily seen there. Although they had been completely extirpated from Point Reyes by the nineteenth century, in 1978, ten tule elk were reintroduced to Point Reyes from the San Luis National Wildlife Refuge near Los Banos. By 2009, the population climbed to over 440 elk at Tomales Point's 2,600 acres of coastal scrub and grasslands. In 1999, 100 elk from Tomales Point were moved to the Limantour wilderness area of the Seashore and above Drakes Beach to Ranch A, as that ranch's long-term lease expired and was not renewed. The drought in 2012-2015 was also a threat to the elk confined north of the fence on Tomales Point, with nearly half the elk there dying from lack of water. In 2012 there were 540 elk, then only 357 in 2013, and by 2014 only 286. In August and September 2020, drought and wildfires again threaten the Tomales Point elk, leading some conservationists to illegally bring water to the elk north of the fence.

The preserve is also very rich in raptors and shorebirds. The western snowy plover that nests here is considered "threatened" under the Endangered Species Act.)

The Point Reyes Lighthouse attracts whale-watchers looking for the gray whale migrating south in mid-January and north in mid-March.

Elephant seals were first observed in 1981 as they recolonized Chimney Beach, which is protected by  cliffs. In January 2019, during the federal government shutdown, park rangers were not working and the seals had pups on Drakes Beach and its parking lot. Small-group tours to view the seals from the edge of the parking lot began the following month after the shutdown ended. Docents help keep the public safe during the winter months as the colony continues to grow each year.

Flora 
Point Reyes lies within the California interior chaparral and woodlands ecoregion.

In his book The Natural History of the Point Reyes Peninsula, Jules Evens identifies several plant communities. One of the most prominent is the Coastal Douglas-fir (Pseudotsuga menziesii) forest, which includes Coast live oak, Tanoak, and California bay and reaches across the southern half of Inverness Ridge toward Bolinas Lagoon. But despite these large, old trees, the forest may nevertheless be a result of European settlement. The Coast Miwok people who once lived in the area set frequent fires to clear brush and increase game animal populations, and early explorers' accounts describe the hills as bare and grassy. But as the Native American settlements were replaced by European ones from the seventeenth century onward, the forests expanded as fire frequency decreased, resulting in the forests we see today.

The Bishop pine (Pinus muricata) forest is found on slopes in the northern half of the park. Many of these trees growing in thick swaths came from seeds released after the 1995 Mt. Vision fire.

Salt, brackish, and freshwater marshlands are found adjacent to Drakes Estero and Abbotts Lagoon.  The other communities identified by Evens are the coastal strand, dominated by European beach grass (Ammophila arenaria), ice plant (Carprobrotus edulis, also called sea fig or Hottentot fig), sea rocket (Cakile maritima) and other species that thrive on the immediate coast; northern coastal prairie, found on a narrow strip just inland from the coastal strand that includes some native grasses; coastal rangeland, the area still grazed by the cattle from the peninsula's remaining working ranches; northern coastal scrub, dominated by coyote bush (Baccharis pilularis); and the intertidal and subtidal plant communities.

Point Reyes is home to the only known population of the endangered Sonoma spineflower, Chorizanthe valida.

Cattle ranches
The park has  of dairy and beef cattle ranching. Extremely high levels of fecal coliform bacteria (Escherichia coli) concentrations have been documented in streams adjacent to existing dairy operations. Cattle manure spreading areas are correlated with the increased presence of invasive and noxious weed species. Tomales Bay, Drakes Estero and Abbotts Lagoon are all affected by E. coli discharges from cattle operations in rainy winter months. A joint inspection in 2022 by the Marin County Environmental Health Services and the National Park Service found the ranches were discharging raw sewage either through leaks or missing septic systems.

Climate

Landmarks and facilities

The Point Reyes Lifeboat Station is a National Historic Landmark. It is the last remaining example of a rail-launched lifeboat station that was common on the Pacific coast.

Nova Albion, Francis Drake's 1579 campsite; Sebastião Rodrigues Soromenho's 1595 wreck; and fifteen associated Native American sites are included in the Drakes Bay Historic and Archaeological District National Historic Landmark.  This encompasses  along the coast of Drakes Bay.

Kule Loklo, a re-created Coast Miwok village, is a short walk from the visitor center.

Lairds Landing was the site of a wharf on the southwest shore of Tomales Bay. It was named after ranchers, Charles and George Laird, who leased the site in 1858 to transport supplies and produce across the bay. The location was settled by the Felix family around 1861, a family of Filipino and Miwok heritage. After the descendants of the Felix family left in 1955, the land was zoned for development, then made part of the Point Reyes National Seashore, before becoming home to artist Clayton Lewis. In 2015, structures built by the Felix family were placed on the National Register of Historic Places.

The Point Reyes National Seashore attracts 2.5 million visitors annually.  Hostelling International USA (part of Hostelling International) maintains a 45-bed youth hostel at the Seashore.

The Point Reyes National Seashore Association, formed in 1964, collaborates with the Seashore on maintenance, restoration and educational projects.

Hiking

Point Reyes has a system of hiking trails for dayhiking and backpacking. Bear Valley Trail is the most popular hike in the park. It travels mostly streamside through a shaded, fern-laden canyon, breaking out at Divide Meadow before heading downward to the coast, where it emerges at Arch Rock. A portion of Arch Rock collapsed on 21 March 2015, killing one person. 
The Earthquake Trail, a  loop that runs over the San Andreas Fault.

At the western end of the Point Reyes Peninsula is the historic Point Reyes Lighthouse, reached by descending 308 steps. Unlike many lighthouses, that were built high so the light could be seen by ships far out to sea, the Point Reyes lighthouse was built low to get the light below the fog that is so prevalent in the area. Nearby is the short Chimney Rock hike, which is noted for its spring wildflower displays.

Point Reyes offers several beach walks. Limantour Spit winds up on a narrow sandy beach, from which Drakes Beach can be glimpsed across Drakes Bay. North Beach and South Beach are often windswept and wave-pounded. Ocean vistas from higher ground can be seen from the Tomales Point Trail and, to the south, from the Palomarin trailhead at the park's southern entrance outside the town of Bolinas. All of the park's beaches were listed as the cleanest in the state in 2010.

For backpackers, Point Reyes has four hike-in campgrounds available by reservation.

Point Reyes is a terminus of the American Discovery Trail which is the only transcontinental trail in the United States.

Marine Protected Areas
Point Reyes State Marine Reserve & Point Reyes State Marine Conservation Area, Estero de Limantour State Marine Reserve & Drakes Estero State Marine Conservation Area and Duxbury Reef State Marine Conservation Area adjoin Point Reyes National Seashore. These marine protected areas help conserve ocean wildlife and marine ecosystems.

Oyster farm

A large shellfish farm raising Japanese (kumamoto) oysters, Crassostrea gigas, was located in Drakes Estero until, under court order, it closed down at end of 2014. Court appeals to keep the operation in place were dropped in December, 2014.

The farm was purchased by the National Park Service in 1972, and the agency issued a permit to allow the previous owner to continue operations for 40 years. The business was sold to a new owner in 2004, the Drakes Bay Oyster Company, who was informed by the NPS at the time of purchase that their permit to operate would not be renewed beyond the November 30, 2012 expiration date. A federal law enacted in 2009 authorized, but did not require, Interior Secretary Ken Salazar to renew the permit. The NPS and conservation groups viewed the farm as an inappropriate and environmentally-insensitive use of the estero, which was designated a "potential wilderness area" by Congress. The farm's supporters argued that it was not ecologically harmful and was important to the local economy.

On November 29, 2012, Salazar announced that he would not renew the permit, citing the original intent of the Point Reyes Wilderness Act to designate the area as wilderness upon the removal of the oyster farm. Salazar visited the farm the previous week and later personally phoned the farm's owner to give him the news.

The oyster farm closure was challenged in U.S. District Court on January 25, 2013. The challenge was rejected by a federal court judge, who ruled that the law gave Salazar unfettered discretion to approve or deny a renewal of the permit. The California Coastal Commission voted on February 7, 2013 to unanimously approve cease and desist and restoration orders for violations of the California Coastal Act. The United States Court of Appeals for the Ninth Circuit rejected an appeal of the district court's decision, ruling on Sept. 3, 2013 that the oyster farm's owner had not shown a likelihood of success on the merits because Salazar had acted within his discretion in denying the permit. An attempt to have the appeals court rehear the case was rejected on January 14, 2014 and a petition to the United States Supreme Court was denied on June 30, 2014. The oyster farm closed its on site retail operation on July 31, 2014. However, controversy continued over the condition of the estero sea floor and the ongoing off shore operations. Another lawsuit challenging the closure itself was rejected in September 2014.

The work to remove the offshore racks and onshore buildings was completed in May 2017;  of debris had been hauled away. The estero is part of the Phillip Burton Wilderness.

Gallery

See also

List of beaches in California
List of California state parks
 Camp Hydle

References

External links

 National Park Service official website about Point Reyes
 West Marin Chamber of Commerce site about Point Reyes
 Point Reyes National Seashore Association, a nonprofit organization working in coordination with the National Park Service.
 Kule Loklo, a recreation of a Coast Miwok Indian village
 Video on controversy over lack of water for tule elk at Tomales Point

 
National Seashores of the United States
National Park Service areas in California
Parks in Marin County, California
Protected areas established in 1962
West Marin